As part of the theory of Freiwirtschaft, Freigeld ('free money') is a monetary (or exchange) unit proposed by Silvio Gesell.

Properties 

Freigeld has several special properties:

 It is maintained by a monetary authority to be spending-power stable (no inflation or deflation) by means of printing more money or withdrawing money from circulation.
 It is cash flow safe (a scheme is put in place to ensure that the money is returned into the cash flow – for example, by demurrage – requiring stamps to be purchased and periodically attached to the money to keep it valid).
 It is convertible into other currencies.
 It is localized to a certain area (it is a local currency).

The name results from the idea that there is no incentive to store or hoard Freigeld as it will automatically lose its value after some time. It is claimed that as a result, interest rates could decrease to zero.

Theory 

According to Gesell, all human-produced goods are subject to expensive storage, whereas money is not: grain loses its weight, metal products rust, housing deteriorates. Therefore, money has a supreme advantage over all other goods. John Maynard Keynes renamed the concept of basic interest articulated in Gesell's book The Natural Economic Order with the more familiar term liquidity preference. Being "liquid" – having money – is a great advantage to anybody, much more so than having comparable amounts (past utility) of any product. The result is that people will not even provide zero-risk, inflation-corrected credits unless a certain interest rate is offered. Freigeld simply reduces this "primordial" interest rate, which is estimated to be somewhere around 3% to 5%, by an absolute, in order to lower the average interest rate to a value around 0.

Examples 

E-gold was an example of a modern private currency in which demurrage is applied. In this case there was a gold storage charge of 1% per annum. The demurrage associated with e-gold is arguably expended by the currency operator to help cover real storage costs.

Bernard Lietaer's terra is a commodity basket currency proposal similar to Keynes's bancor or L'Europa and bearing a demurrage charge.

The chiemgauer is a regional community currency in a part of Bavaria, using a demurrage system.

In fiction
Michael Ende has stated to have had the concept of aging money in mind when writing his children's novel Momo.

See also 

 Freiwirtschaft
 Demurrage (currency)
 The Wörgl Experiment

References 

 Margrit Kennedy. Interest and Inflation Free Money. 1995. 

Local currencies
Monetary reform
Freiwirtschaft